TaskUs is an U.S. outsourcing company that handles content moderation for companies including Facebook  and Doordash.

History 
The company was founded by Bryce Maddock and Jaspar Weir in 2008 in Santa Monica, California.

Early funding included $15 million from Navegar, a private equity fund in the Philippines, and a $14 million loan from Bridge Bank. The Blackstone Group invested $250 million in 2018.

It moved its headquarters to San Antonio, Texas in 2017, then to New Braunfels, Texas in 2018.

In 2020, revenue climbed 33% to $478 million. 

Its revenue for the first half of 2021 was $332.9 million.

Products and Services 
The company's main service is providing content moderation for different companies. Furthermore they offer consulting, content security and AI operations.

Company 
The company's principal operations are in the Philippines, with about 19,000 employees (70% of their total) located there. About 4000 employees are located in the United States.  Altogether the company has about 27,500 employees spread across eight countries.

Approximately 20% of the company's revenue is from providing content moderation for Facebook, and about 12% is from Doordash.

Other customers include Coinbase (beginning in 2017), Netflix, Zoom (beginning in 2020), Whisper, Tinder, AutoDesk, and Uber (beginning in 2013).

The current CEO is Bryce Maddock. Jaspar Weir, also co-founder of TaskUs, sits on the company's boards of directors.

References

External links

 Official Website

Outsourcing companies
Business services companies established in 2008
Business process outsourcing companies of the United States
Business in the Philippines
2021 initial public offerings
2008 establishments in California
Companies based in New Braunfels, Texas
Companies listed on the Nasdaq